Christian Sendegeya is a Burundian politician. He is a member of the Pan-African Parliament from Burundi. He has also been the governor of Muramvya Province. He returned to Burundi in 2001 after seven years of exile in Denmark.

A Tutsi, he was a member of the pro-Hutu party CNDD and even served as their vice-president.

References

Year of birth missing (living people)
Living people
National Council for the Defense of Democracy – Forces for the Defense of Democracy politicians
Front for Democracy in Burundi politicians
Members of the Pan-African Parliament from Burundi
Tutsi people
People from Ngozi Province
Expatriates in Denmark